The Cathedral of the Holy Spirit is a cathedral and parish church of the Catholic Church located in Bismarck, North Dakota, United States.  It is the seat of the Diocese of Bismarck.  Since 1980 the cathedral and the nearby Bishop's Residence have been contributing properties in the Bismarck Cathedral Area Historic District on the National Register of Historic Places.

History
The cathedral was the dream of the first bishop of Bismarck, Vincent Wehrle, O.S.B., who had a special devotion to the Holy Spirit and wanted the church to also serve as a shrine to the Holy Spirit. He brought the property in 1917 and hired Milwaukee architect Anton Dohman in 1921 to design the cathedral. He provided two different designs; the first was similar to the church at Assumption Abbey in Richardton, North Dakota. The Great Depression prevented the construction of the cathedral until 1941.

Bismarck's second bishop, Vincent Ryan, hired Fargo architect William F. Kurke, who had helped design the North Dakota Capitol building, to design the new cathedral. His design was similar to Dohman's second design. The groundbreaking for the Art Deco style building was begun in September 1941. The building is composed of monolithic concrete, and is believed to be the only Art Deco-style cathedral in the United States. The church opened in August 1945, but its interior decoration and some of its furnishings were added in later years. A renovation from 1992 to 1993 added a gathering space, which reflects the cathedral's Art Deco style. The cathedral's tall bell tower is a local landmark that is visible from a distance.

Attendant buildings
In addition to the cathedral, Kurke also designed the nearby Bishop's Residence. The two-story, concrete, Art Deco structure was built at the same time as the cathedral. The grade school was completed in 1951. The two-story building features a flat roof, precast concrete panels, and two horizontal window bands that run about two-thirds of the width of the facade. A school building between the cathedral and the residence was originally part of Kurke's plan, but the long and low building features a more contemporary style that differs from the original plans. The two-story brick convent was completed in 1965, and the two-story rectory in 1969. The rectory's exterior is composed of brick on the first floor and vertical siding on the second floor. The convent now houses the Center for Pastoral Ministry of the Diocese of Bismarck.

See also
List of Catholic cathedrals in the United States
List of cathedrals in the United States

References

External links 

Official Cathedral Site
Diocese of Bismarck Official Site

Holy Spirit Bismarck
Churches in the Roman Catholic Diocese of Bismarck
Roman Catholic churches completed in 1945
Tourist attractions in Bismarck, North Dakota
National Register of Historic Places in Bismarck, North Dakota
Historic district contributing properties in North Dakota
Churches on the National Register of Historic Places in North Dakota
20th-century Roman Catholic church buildings in the United States
Art Deco architecture in North Dakota